"Magic" is a song by Australian musical duo Disco Montego featuring guest vocals from Australian singer-songwriter Katie Underwood. It was released as the third single from the duo's second album, Disco Montego (2002), on 12 August 2002. The song reached  22 on the Australian ARIA Singles Chart that September.

Track listing
Australian CD single
 "Magic"
 "Magic" (Thruster Spell remix)
 "Magic" (Funk Corporation's Sleight of Hand club mix)
 "Beautiful" (Disco Montego remix)

Charts

References

Disco Montego songs
2002 singles
2002 songs
Warner Music Group singles